Shakyla Denise Hill (born December 14, 1996) is an American basketball player. She played college basketball for Grambling State where she became the first woman to record two quadruple-double's over her career. She later went on to play professionally in Serbia where she recorded the first quadruple-double in the ZLS's history.

College career
Hill played for Grambling State University from 2015 to 2019. On January 4, 2018, she recorded a quadruple-double, the first one in the NCAA for 25 years, with 15 points, 10 rebounds, 10 assists and 10 steals. On February 3, 2019, she posted the second quadruple-double of her career with 21 points, 16 rebounds, 13 assists and 10 steals in a victory against over Arkansas-Pine Bluf.

Professional career
After going undrafted in the 2019 WNBA draft, Hill signed with Serbian club ŽKK Kraljevo of the First Women's Basketball League of Serbia (ZLS) and the regional WABA League in September 2019. On January 26, 2020, she posted another quadruple-double, the first in ZLS history, with 15 points, 10 rebounds, 10 assists and 10 steals against KZK Partizan. In March 2020, she helped Kraljevo win the Milan Ciga Vasojević Cup. Kraljevo had a 17–1 record when the rest of the 2019–20 ZLS season was canceled due to the COVID-19 pandemic in Serbia. In the ZLS league, she averaged 13.3 points, 8.1 rebounds, 6.3 assists and 5.7 steals per game. In the WABA League, she averaged 14.3 points, 6.4 rebounds, 6.1 assists and 4.2 steals per game.

In January 2022, Hill joined Bashkimi Prizren of the Kosovo Women's Basketball Superleague. In February, she won the Kosovo Cup.

Statistics

College statistics

Source

References

External links
Grambling State Tigers bio
Profile at Eurobasket.com
WABA League profile

1996 births
Living people
African-American basketball players
American expatriate basketball people in Serbia
American women's basketball players
Basketball players from Arkansas
Grambling State Tigers women's basketball players
Point guards
Sportspeople from Little Rock, Arkansas
21st-century African-American sportspeople
21st-century African-American women